Myrsine juergensenii is a species of broadleaf evergreen plant in the family Primulaceae.

References

juergensenii
Taxonomy articles created by Polbot